Georges Lampin (14 October 1901 – 8 May 1979) was a French actor and film director. He directed twelve films between 1946 and 1963.

Selected filmography

Director
 The Idiot (1946)
 Eternal Conflict (1948)
 Return to Life (1949)
 Old Boys of Saint-Loup (1950)
 Passion (1951)
 The House on the Dune (1952)
 Follow That Man (1953)
 Crime and Punishment (1956)
 Meeting in Paris (1956)
 La Tour, prends garde ! (1958)
 Mathias Sandorf (1963)

Actor
 Carmen (1926)
 Napoleon (1927)

Producer
 Adrienne Lecouvreur (1938)

References

External links

1901 births
1979 deaths
French film directors
French male film actors
Emigrants from the Russian Empire to France